Menno Emanuël Sluijter (born 31 July 1932, Haarlem) is an anaesthetist from the Netherlands.

Sluijter obtained his MD at the University of Amsterdam in 1957 and his PhD at the same institution in 1963 with the dissertation The treatment of carbon monoxide poisoning by administration of oxygen at high atmospheric pressure. Sluijter is credited with the development of pulsed radiofrequency treatment. He is involved in research related to chronic pain. He is also affiliated with the Jan van Goyen Clinic in Amsterdam. He has helped to work on shifting how physicians deal with long term pain from 'pain management', to 'pain treatment.'

References

Sources
Alexandre Teixeira MD, Menno E. Sluijter MD, PhD (2006): Intradiscal High-Voltage, Long-Duration Pulsed Radiofrequency for Discogenic Pain: A Preliminary Report. Pain Medicine 7 (5), pages 424–428.

External links
drstokke.no

1932 births
Living people
Dutch anesthesiologists
Academic staff of Maastricht University
University of Amsterdam alumni
Academic staff of the University of Amsterdam
Scientists from Haarlem